Crocus cloth is an abrasive sheet similar to sand paper or emery cloth but covered with a layer of very fine loose iron oxide particles rather than with bound grains of abrasive.  It is intended for final metal and gemstone finishing and is available in various grades (particle sizes). Federal Specification P-C-458 described this material in detail, although the specification was cancelled in 1989.

References

Abrasives